Turkey River may refer to

Turkey River, Iowa, an unincorporated community 
Turkey River (Iowa), a tributary of the Mississippi River
Turkey River (New Hampshire), a tributary of the Merrimack River